John C. Anderson was a member of the Wisconsin State Assembly.

Biography
Anderson was born on February 22, 1862, in Hadley, New York. He later moved with his parents to Richland County, Wisconsin, where he became a farmer. In 1896, he settled in Cazenovia, Wisconsin, where he also became a businessman and a banker.

Political career
Aderson was elected to the Assembly in 1916 and 1918. In addition, he was Village Treasurer and Postmaster of Cazenovia. He was a Republican.

References

People from Hadley, New York
People from Cazenovia, Wisconsin
Republican Party members of the Wisconsin State Assembly
Wisconsin postmasters
American treasurers
Farmers from Wisconsin
Businesspeople from Wisconsin
American bankers
1862 births
Year of death missing